Murushid Juuko (born 14 April 1994) is a Ugandan professional footballer who plays as a centre back for Express FC.

Club career
Juuko was born in Entebbe, Wakiso District. He has played club football for Ugandan clubs Bunamwaya and SC Victoria University before moving to Tanzania to play for Simba.

Juuko joined Express FC in 2020 on a one-year contract.

International career
Juuko made his Uganda national team (the "Cranes") debut on 11 July 2014 against Seychelles national team. Uganda national team won 1-0.

AFCON 2017
Juuko guided the Cranes to their first Africa Cup of Nations finals since 1978. He was part of the team that defeated Comoros 1–0 to qualify for the 2017 finals in Gabon. Having missed the first game against Ghana due to a suspension picked up during qualifiers he played 180 minutes against Egypt and Mali.

AFCON 2019
During the 2019 Africa Cup of Nations Juuko played two matches, the first one against DR Congo and another against Senegal after sustaining a hamstring injury. The Uganda Cranes ended the championship in the round of 16.

Career statistics

International

International goals
Scores and results list Uganda's goal tally first.

Honors
Vipers
Ugandan Premier League: 2010

SC Victoria University
 CECAFA Nile Basin Cup: 2014
 Ugandan Cup: 2013–14

Simba
 Tanzanian Premier League: 2017–18, 2018–19
 Kombe la Shirikisho la Azam (Azam Sports Federation Cup – ASFC): 2017
 Kombe La Mapinduzi: 2015
 SportPesa Super Cup: 2017, 2018

References

External links

1994 births
Living people
People from Entebbe
Ugandan footballers
Association football defenders
Uganda international footballers
2017 Africa Cup of Nations players
2019 Africa Cup of Nations players
Vipers SC players
SC Victoria University players
Simba S.C. players
Wydad AC players
Express FC players
Ugandan expatriate footballers
Ugandan expatriate sportspeople in Tanzania
Expatriate footballers in Tanzania
Ugandan expatriate sportspeople in Morocco
Expatriate footballers in Morocco
Tanzanian Premier League players